The 2011 Torneo Apertura was part of the 61st completed season of the Primera B de Chile.

Deportes Antofagasta was tournament's champion.

League table

References

External links
 RSSSF 2011

Primera B de Chile seasons
Primera B
Chil